José Carlos Capinam (born 19 February 1941), better known as Capinam or Capinan, is a Brazilian lyricist and poet. He was active in Brazil's tropicália movement in the 1960s, and he wrote lyrics for various tropicália musicians.

Biography
Born in Esplanada, Bahia, Brazil, at 19 years of age, Capinam moved to Salvador, Bahia and attended the Federal University of Bahia where he studied law. At university, he was a member of the União Nacional dos Estudantes (National Student Union), and he befriended musicians Gilberto Gil (who was studying business) and Caetano Veloso (who was studying philosophy). The 1964 military coup d'état forced him to leave Salvador, and he relocated to São Paulo. In São Paulo he worked on poems for his first book, Inquisitórial. Eventually he returned to Salvador, this time to study medicine.

In 2000, he composed the opera Rei Brasil 500 Anos with Fernando Cerqueira and Paul Gold, to celebrate the 500th anniversary of Brazil's discovery.

Songs
He has co-written songs with Gilberto Gil, Caetano Veloso, and others:
 Gil: "Viramundo" (on Louvação, 1967); "Ponteio" (com Edu Lobo, destaque do III Festival da Record)  "Miserere nóbis" (on Tropicália ou Panis et Circencis, 1968), "Soy loco por tí, América" (recorded by Veloso on Caetano Veloso, 1968)
 Veloso: "Clarice" (on Caetano Veloso, 1968); "The Empty Boat" (on Álbum Branco, 1969)
 Paulinho da Viola: "Canção para Maria"

References

External links 
 

1941 births
20th-century Brazilian male writers
20th-century Brazilian poets
21st-century Brazilian male writers
21st-century Brazilian poets
Brazilian male poets
Brazilian lyricists
People from Salvador, Bahia
Living people